Langwarrin Soccer Club is an Australian soccer club from Langwarrin South, a suburb of Melbourne, Victoria, Australia. The club was formed 1964, and currently competes in the National Premier Leagues Victoria 2.

History 
Langwarrin Soccer Club was formed by local Dutch Australians in 1964 as an alternative to Australian rules football in the region. The initial name of the club was The Langwarrin All Stars. The side played its first games at the local primary school, and soon moved to the site of the Frankston golf driving range on Cranbourne Road. The first game was against Melbourne who beat the young All Stars 20–1.

In 1968 the club moved to its current home on Barretts Road. The land was donated to the club by Wally Lawton and became known as Lawton Park. The first senior team at Langwarrin was formed in 1968.

In 1981, Langwarrin entered the Victorian Provisional League One. In 1991, works were completed on the new clubrooms at Lawton Reserve. In 1994 the grounds were relaid.

In 1999 Gus Macleod was appointed as senior head coach of the club, a position he would go on to hold for 20 seasons.

Langwarrin was promoted to the National Premier Leagues Victoria 2 competition after taking out the State League Division 1 South-East championship title in 2017. In 2018, the club's first season in the National Premier Leagues league system, Langy finished in 8th place in the 10-team NPL2 East competition.

In August 2018, after iconic coach Gus Macleod resigned from his role, the club announced that Scott Miller would coach the team for the 2019 season. Miller brought in a number of high-profile players for the 2019 season, including former Oakleigh Cannons midfielder Wayne Wallace, Damir Stoilovic, David Stirton, Roddy Covarrubias, Jamie Cumming, Jordan Templin and Fraser Maclaren.

Current squad

League Standings

Honours

Team

State League 1
Champions(1) 2017

State League 2
Champions(1) 2004
Runners Up (3) 2001,2002,2003

State League 3
Champions(1) 2000

State League 4
Champions(1) 1999

Individual
  State League 1 South-East Golden Boot
2016 - Caleb Nicholes

References

External links
Langwarrin Official Website
Football Federation Victoria Official website

Association football clubs established in 1964
Soccer clubs in Melbourne
Victorian State League teams
1964 establishments in Australia
Sport in the City of Frankston